Wrestling at the 2013 Southeast Asian Games was held at Thuwunna Indoor Stadium, Yangon, Myanmar between December 9–13.

Medalists

Men's Greco-Roman

Men's freestyle

Women's freestyle

Medal table

References

2013 Southeast Asian Games events
2013
Southeast Asian Games